Wilson Whitley (May 28, 1955 – October 27, 1992) was a consensus All-American defensive tackle at the University of Houston from 1972–1976 under defensive coordinator Don Todd.  He led the Cougars to the Southwest Conference championship in football during Houston's first season as a conference member and won the 1976 Lombardi Award as the nation's top lineman. Former President Gerald Ford presented him the award at a ceremony in Houston, Texas.

Whitley was drafted in the first round by the Cincinnati Bengals and started alongside another Lombardi Award winner, Ross Browner, for 6 seasons.  He was later named to the Southwest Conference "All Decade Team" for the 1970s.

Whitley died at the age of 37, due to a heart condition.  He is a 1998 inductee into University of Houston's Hall of Honor and was a perennial candidate for the National College Football Hall of Fame until his selection in 2007.

1955 births
1992 deaths
All-American college football players
American football defensive tackles
Cincinnati Bengals players
Houston Cougars football players
College Football Hall of Fame inductees